John Dunning (18 April 1927 – 11 September 2009) was an English professional snooker player from Morley, West Yorkshire.

Career
Dunning joined the Royal Navy aged 18, and served for two years. He later managed a newsagent's shop and was also a window cleaner. Having been Yorkshire amateur champion on eleven occasions, and the CIU Championship in 1963, 1966 and 1969, Dunning turned professional in 1971 at the age of 45. He played his first World Championship match in 1972, when he lost to John Pulman in the first round, after beating Pat Houlihan and Graham Miles in qualifying. He produced his best performance in 1974, when he reached the quarter-final, subsequently losing his match against Miles 13–15. Dunning's final appearance in the main stages of the event came in 1982.

In 1977, he reached the quarter-finals of the inaugural UK Championship, losing 0–5 to Alex Higgins.

Dunning reached the final of the International Masters in March 1984. The tournament, played on a three-man-group round-robin basis, saw Dunning start as a 7–1 outsider to qualify from his first group. He beat Tony Knowles 2–1 in the opening game, he became favourite, before comfortably winning his next match against Les Dodd. In his semi-final match, he played against Australian Warren King and Terry Griffiths of Wales. Dunning lost to King, but beat Griffiths, which earnt him a place in the final, in which he met Dave Martin and the reigning World Champion and world number one Steve Davis. He lost both matches, finishing third, with Davis winning the title, but received a cheque for £6,000. He became the oldest-ever finalist in a major snooker event, aged 56 years and 11 months.

Dunning played his last match as a professional in 1997 at the age of 69. His highest world ranking was 11th, in the 1976/1977 ranking list.

He died in Morley, West Yorkshire, on 11 September 2009, aged 82.

References

Sportspeople from Chesterfield, Derbyshire
1927 births
2009 deaths
Snooker players from Leeds
Sportspeople from Morley, West Yorkshire
English snooker players

de:John Dunning